Ranakpur is a village located in Desuri tehsil near Sadri town in the Pali district  of Rajasthan in western India. It is located between Jodhpur and Udaipur. 162 km from Jodhpur and 91 km from Udaipur, in a valley on the western side of the Aravalli Range. The Nearest Railway Station to reach Ranakpur is Falna and Rani railway station. Ranakpur is one of the most famous places to visit in Pali, Rajasthan. Ranakpur is easily accessed by road from Udaipur.
Pali district in Rajasthan.Ranakpur is widely known for its marble Jain temple, said to be the most spectacular of the Jain temples.

Jain temple
The renowned Jain temple at Ranakpur is dedicated to Tirthankara Adinatha. Local legend has it that Dharma Shah, a local Jain businessperson, started construction of the temple in the 15th century following a divine vision.  The temple honours Adinath, the first Tirthankar of the present half-cycle (avasarpiṇī) according to Jain cosmology.  The town of Ranakpur and the temple are named after the provincial ruler monarch, Rana Kumbha who supported the construction of the temple.

Picture gallery

See also

 Jain Temple
 List of Jain temples
 Jain art

Notes

References
L. Clermont & T. Dix authored/photographed book, "Jainism and the temples of Mount Abu and Ranakpur".
 History of Ranakpur Temple
 Ranakpur Temple
 Ranakpur
Godwar

External links
About the ranakpur temple
Jaina Architecture in India ch. 6. The Adinatha Temple at Ranakpur
Temple of Ranakpur

Villages in Pali district